The Chipewyan Prairie First Nation is a First Nations band government located in northeast Alberta south of Fort McMurray.

It is a member of the Athabasca Tribal Council and a Treaty 8 nation. The Athabasca Tribal Council represents 5 First Nation bands in northeast Alberta.

Demographics
As of August 2016 the Chipewyan Prairie First Nation (Tł'ógh tëlı́ dënesųłı̨ne) ca. 31 km² had a total population of 923 with 390 members living on reserve and 533 members living off-reserve.

Reserves
 Cowper Lake 194A on the north shore of Cowper Lake is 143 hectares.
 Janvier 194 the largest territory with 2486.70 hectares and the most populous with 295 residents in 2011 is 97 km southwest of Fort McMurray. 145 of the residents chose Dene as their mother tongue in 2011. 
 Winefred Lake 194B (Ɂuldáze1 tué) on the north end of Winefred Lake is 450 hectares.

See also
Chipewyan people
Chipewyan language
List of Indian reserves in Alberta

References

External links
Chipewyan Prairie Dene First Nation official website

Dene governments
First Nations governments in Alberta